Pyranthrene is a genus of moths in the family Sesiidae containing only one species, Pyranthrene flammans, which is known from Malawi.

References

Endemic fauna of Malawi
Sesiidae
Lepidoptera of Malawi
Moths of Sub-Saharan Africa
Moths described in 1919